Pedro Manuel Cavadas Ferreira (born 6 March 1992), known as Pedro Cavadas, is a Portuguese footballer who plays for Gondomar as a goalkeeper.

Club career
He made his professional debut in the Segunda Liga for Braga B on 2 September 2012 in a game against Tondela.

References

External links

1992 births
People from Valongo
Living people
Portuguese footballers
Association football goalkeepers
Boavista F.C. players
S.C. Braga B players
Liga Portugal 2 players
C.F. Os Belenenses players
Gondomar S.C. players
Sportspeople from Porto District